Lichfield City Football Club is a football club based in Lichfield, Staffordshire, England.

History
The original Lichfield City joined the Birmingham Combination in 1923, but left after two seasons. The modern club was established in 1970 as Lichfield Football Club and joined Division One B of the West Midlands (Regional) League in 1976. They were placed in Division One the following season when the league was reorganised and remained in the division until being relegated to Division Two at the end of the 1985–86 season. The club were Division Two runners-up in 1989–90, earning promotion back to Division One. In 1994 they were renamed Lichfield City. Their first season under the new name saw the club finish as runners-up in Division One, earning promotion to the Premier Division.

Despite finishing in mid-table in their first season in the Premier Division, Lichfield resigned from the league and became a Sunday league team. They returned to Saturday football when the club joined Division Three of the Midland Combination in 2008. Despite only finishing fifth in the division in 2008–09, they were promoted to Division Two. In 2010–11 the club won the league's Challenge Vase with a 2–1 win over Continental Star Reserves in the final. They also finished fourth in the division, earning promotion to Division One. Another fourth-place finish the following season led to them being promoted to the Premier Division.

In 2014 the Midland Combination merged with the Midland Alliance to form the Midland League, with Lichfield placed in Division One. In 2021 the club were promoted to the Premier Division  based on their results in the abandoned 2019–20 and 2020–21 seasons.

Honours
Midland Combination
Challenge Vase winners 2010–11

Records
Best FA Cup performance: Second qualifying round, 2022–23
Best FA Vase performance: Second round, 2016–17

See also
Lichfield City F.C. players
Lichfield City F.C. managers

References

External links

 
Football clubs in England
Football clubs in Staffordshire
1970 establishments in England
Association football clubs established in 1970
Lichfield
Birmingham Combination
West Midlands (Regional) League
Midland Football Combination
Midland Football League